Charles-Gilbert Romme (26 March 1750 – 17 June 1795) was a French politician and mathematician who developed the French Republican Calendar.

Biography
Charles Gilbert Romme was born in Riom, Puy-de-Dôme, in the Auvergne region of France, where he received an education in medicine and mathematics. After spending five years in Paris, he went to Russia to become the tutor of Paul Stroganoff. He returned to Paris in 1788 and entered political life.

He was a member of the Masonic lodge, Les Neuf Sœurs.

Elected on 10 September 1791 to the Legislative Assembly, Romme aligned himself with the Girondists, but after his election to the National Convention on 6 September 1792, he sided with the Montagnards.

He voted in favour of the death sentence for Louis XVI. Later, in the events leading up to the Reign of Terror, he was arrested by Girondist supporters and was imprisoned in Caen for two months.

Aware of their military importance, he also was an early supporter of semaphore telegraphs. He served as president of the Convention from 21 November to 6 December 1793.

Because he was on an assignment to organise gun production for the navy, he had no hand in the coup of 9 Thermidor an II (27 July 1794), which resulted in the fall of the Robespierre (and ultimately led to the return of the Girondists).

When rioting sans-culottes, demanding bread and the Jacobin constitution, violently occupied the Convention on 1 Prairial an III (20 May 1795), Romme supported their demands. This insurrection was quickly put down however, and he and other Montagnards were arrested. While waiting for their trial, the defendants agreed to commit suicide in case of a death sentence.

On 29 Prairial (17 June), Paris, France, Romme and five others were sentenced to the guillotine. With a knife hidden by Jean-Marie Goujon, he stabbed himself repeatedly while on the staircase leading from the courtroom, and died — his last words are reported to have been "I die for the republic".

In Romme le Montagnard (1833), Marc de Vissac described Romme as a small, awkward and clumsy man with an ill complexion and a dull orator but also as possessing a pleasant and instructive style of conversation.

References

Sources 

 A biography of Romme
 The French Revolution (Thomas Carlyle)
 The Semaphore Telegraph
  Gilbert Romme
  Genea Guide

1750 births
1795 deaths
People from Riom
People of the French Revolution
Occitan people
Les Neuf Sœurs
Presidents of the National Convention